The Scottish Fire and Rescue Service (SFRS) is the national fire and rescue service of Scotland. It was formed by the merger of eight regional fire services in the country on 1 April 2013. It thus became the largest fire brigade in the United Kingdom, surpassing the London Fire Brigade.

Consolidation
After a consultation, the Scottish Government confirmed on 8 September 2011 that a single fire and rescue service would be created in Scotland to replace the eight existing local authority fire and rescue services.

Following further consultation on the detailed operation of the service, the Police and Fire Reform (Scotland) Bill was published on 17 January 2012. After scrutiny and debate by the Scottish Parliament, the legislation was approved on 27 June 2012. The Bill duly received royal assent as the Police and Fire Reform (Scotland) Act 2012. This Act also created Police Scotland in place of the previous eight regional police forces. The mergers were effective from 1 April 2013. Eight months after the consolidation, an internal report said the reorganisation had not negatively affected operational response.

The eight services that were merged are:

The number of control rooms handling 999 calls was also reduced from eight to three.

The consolidation of regional call centres has reportedly resulted in a number of dispatching errors. For example, a crew from Beauly was sent to a blaze 10 miles away in Dingwall as the dispatcher was allegedly unaware Dingwall had its own fire station.

The service is headquartered in Cambuslang, South Lanarkshire, on the south-eastern outskirts of Glasgow, incorporating a national training centre, opened in January 2013. There are a further three service delivery centres in the east, west and north of the country.

Structure

On 16 August 2012, the Scottish Government confirmed the first chief fire officer of the new service would be Alasdair Hay, then acting chief fire officer of Tayside Fire and Rescue Service, following an open recruitment exercise.

Pat Watters, former president of the Convention of Scottish Local Authorities, was also announced as chair of the service, an appointment to run for three years from September 2012.

Members of the SFRS Board appointed in October 2012 were Watters, Bob Benson, James Campbell, Kirsty Darwent, Marieke Dwarshuis, Michael Foxley, Robin Iffla, Bill McQueen, Sid Patten, Neil Pirie, Martin Togneri and Grant Thoms.

Chief officers
20132019: Alasdair Hay
20192022: Martin Blunden
2022present: Ross Haggart

Operations 

The Scottish Fire and Rescue Service attended 25,002 fires in 2014/15. The service also delivers a preventative programme, with 65,343 free home fire safety visits conducted in 2015/16.

As well as fighting fires, the service attends a wide range of specialist incidents, such as road traffic collisions (RTC), water rescue, rope (line) rescue, urban search and rescue (USAR), chemical biological radiological and nuclear (CBRN) and terrorist attacks. In 2014/15, the service attended 10,740 non-fire incidents.

Water rescue 

After the 2013 merger of SFRS and the abundance of rivers and lochs, it was decided a generalised and revised water rescue capability should be established. The result of this is a Mercedes Sprinter van containing water rescue equipment, welfare facilities, and trailering a rigid permanently inflated boat for immediate deployment. Twenty of SFRS' stations have one of these dedicated water rescue units.
The Water Rescue Units regularly respond to flooding, difficulty in water, and water-related rescue incidents.

The service is the primary emergency service for the rescue of persons from the River Clyde in Glasgow and works alongside other emergency services during flooding events to ensure the safety of communities and rescue people in difficulty, with specialist swift water rescue teams positioned on major waterways and areas of activity. Firefighters are routinely called out to water, flood and boat rescues. For example, during Storm Frank in December 2015, SFRS received 350 flood-related calls in the space of six days.

Wildfires 
In 2015, SFRS were called out to 78 wildfire incidents in total, with over half of those taking place in the north of Scotland.

Medical emergencies 
In 2015, a national trial was launched, in partnership with the Scottish Ambulance Service, which has seen firefighters at certain stations receive enhanced  cardiopulmonary resuscitation (CPR) training aimed at increasing survival rates for people who suffer out-of-hospital cardiac arrests.

In 2007, Grampian Fire & Rescue Service in partnership with the Scottish Ambulance Service launched two Community first responder vehicles at Braemar and Maud fire stations, firefighters at these specific stations trained at First Responder levels can be pagered by the North SDA on request of the Scottish Ambulance Service.

Line rescue 
Line or rope rescue is a type of technical rescue involving the use of ropes, harness, anchoring and hauling devices to assist rescues at height or below ground level at urban and structural locations. While many crews are trained to a safe working at height (SWAH) standard, line rescue crews are trained to a more advanced capacity to deal with more complex technical rescues at the likes of open structures, utilising horizontal and vertical stretcher lowering and raising.

Four stations contain these line rescue units (LRU), strategically placed across the country in Altens (Aberdeen), Lochgelly, Tollcross (Edinburgh), and East Kilbride.

Fire stations 

Currently the Scottish Fire & Rescue Service operate 356 fire stations throughout Scotland. Scotland's fire stations are crewed in six different ways:
Wholetime (WT): A station with full-time firefighters crewing twenty-fours a day.
Wholetime/Retained Duty System (WT/RDS): As above but with retained firefighters providing back-up when required. 
Wholetime/Day-Crewed (WT/DC): Livingston fire station operates with wholetime firefighters crewing the first appliance, and day-shift firefighters crewing the second appliance, and who will then respond via pager at night if required.
Retained Duty System (RDS): Crewing on an 'on-call' basis. These are predominantly located in some of the more rural areas.
Volunteer (VOL): as above but firefighters receive no payment for their work.
Community Response Unit (CRU): a volunteer unit with a small LDV appliance specifically suited to their particular area. Found in the Highlands.

Northern Service Delivery Area

The Northern Service Delivery Area incorporates all of the fire stations of the former fire & rescue services of Grampian (GFRS), Highlands & Islands (H&IFRS) and Tayside (TFRS). It has 1.2million residents and operates 164 fire stations. The Northern Service Delivery Area headquarters is located at Dyce fire station on the outskirts of the city of Aberdeen. For ease of operations and multi-agency interaction, the Service Delivery Area is further sub-divided into smaller Local Service Areas structured  in line with local councils; they are:

East Service Delivery Area
The East Service Delivery Area incorporates fire stations of the former Central Scotland Fire & Rescue Service (CSFRS), Fife Fire & Rescue Service (FFRS) and Lothian & Borders Fire & Rescue Service (L&BFRS). It has 1.6million residents and operates 65 fire stations. The East Delivery Service Area Headquarters are located at Newbridge, to the west of Edinburgh. The facilities at Newbridge also house the workshops and Asset Resource Centre. In 2020, a new state of the art training facility was opened at Newbridge, which replaced the former one at Thornton, in Fife. 
For ease of operations and multi-agency interaction, the Service Delivery Area is further sub-divided into smaller Local Service Areas structured in line with local councils; they are:

Western Service Delivery Area

The Western Service Delivery Area incorporates all the fire stations of both the former Dumfries & Galloway Fire and Rescue Service (D&GFRS) and Strathclyde Fire & Rescue (SFR). It has 2.4million residents and operates 127 fire stations. The Western Service Delivery Area headquarters is located at Hamilton Fire Station to the east of Glasgow. For ease of operations and multi-agency interaction, the Service Delivery Area is further sub-divided into smaller Local Service Areas structured in line with local councils; they are:

National Training Centre

The Scottish Fire and Rescue Service National Training Centre opened in January 2013. The facility in Cambuslang features a mock town with realistic motorways, railway tracks and buildings, including a multi-storey tenement structure.

See also
His Majesty's Fire Service Inspectorate for Scotland
Mountain Rescue Committee of Scotland
List of British firefighters killed in the line of duty

References

External links

 
2013 establishments in Scotland